Dawes Township is one of eleven townships in Thurston County, Nebraska, United States. The population was 304 at the 2020 census.

The Village of Rosalie lies within the Township.

See also
County government in Nebraska

References

External links
City-Data.com

Townships in Thurston County, Nebraska
Townships in Nebraska